Yevpatoria is a Ukrainian city of regional significance in Western Crimea, north of Kalamita Bay. Yevpatoria serves as the administrative center of Yevpatoria Municipality, one of the districts (raions) into which Crimea is divided. It had a population of

History

Greek settlement 

The first recorded settlement in the area, called Kerkinitis, was built by Greek colonists around 500 BCE. Along with the rest of the Crimea, Kerkinitis formed part of the dominions of King Mithridates VI Eupator ( BCE). The name of the modern city derives from his nickname, Eupator ("of noble father").

Khanate period 

From roughly the 7th through the 10th centuries, Yevpatoria  was a Khazar settlement; its name in Khazar language was probably Güzliev (literally "beautiful house"). It was later subject to the Cumans (Kipchaks), the Mongols and the Crimean Khanate. During this period the city was called Kezlev by Crimean Tatars and Gözleve by Ottoman Turks. The Russian medieval name Kozlov is a Russification of the Crimean Tatar name. For a short period between 1478 and 1485, the city was administrated by the Ottoman Empire. Afterwards, it became an important urban center of the Crimean Khanate.

The 400-year-old Juma-Jami Mosque is one of the many designed by the Ottoman architect Mimar Sinan. It was built in 1552-1564. 35-metre minarets rose on the flanks of the building. The mosque was of great state significance. It was here that a ceremony of the declaration of rights of the Crimean Khans was held at their enthronement. Only after that did they go to their capital, the city of Bakhchysarai.

Yevpatoria became a residence of the spiritual ruler of the Crimean Karaites, the Ḥakham. In this connection, a complex of two prayer houses was built under the supervision of the Rabovich brothers, in which the Renaissance and Muslim architectural styles entwined in a most unusual manner. The ensemble organically incorporates three courtyards. The entrance to it is marked by gates, built in 1900, which look like a refined triumphal arch.

Russian rule 

In 1783, along with the rest of the Crimea, Kezlev was captured by the Russian Empire. Its name was officially changed to Yevpatoriya in 1784. This spelling of the city name came to the French, German, Spanish and English languages at the end of the 18th сentury.

Polish poet Adam Mickiewicz visited the town in 1825 and wrote one of his Crimean Sonnets here; it was later translated into Russian by Mikhail Lermontov.

The city was occupied in September 1854 by British, French and Turkish troops during the Crimean War prior to the Allied landing in Kalamita Bay, after which the Battle of the Alma south of the bay followed. It became a garrison of Ottoman troops later during the war and was the site of the Battle of Eupatoria in February 1855, which was the largest military clash in the Crimean theatre outside the Sevastopol area.

Since 1930s 

Natural factors at Yevpatoria created excellent conditions for the treatment of osteo-articular tuberculosis and other children's diseases, and in 1933, at a scientific conference in Yalta, it was agreed that among Soviet resort towns, the most suitable for the organization of children's resort was Yevpatoria. In 1936, the Soviet government placed the All-Union children's resort in Yevpatoria. In 1938, the approved plan of general reconstruction of the city. 

During World War II, sanatoriums were used as military hospitals. By July 1, 1945, in Yevpatoria operated 14 sanatoriums, have taken 2,885 people. By the 1980s, the city operated 78 sanatoriums for 33 thousand people. About one million vacationers visited Yevpatoria in summer time without the purpose of treatment.

Today Yevpatoria is a major Black Sea port, a rail hub, and resort town. The population swells greatly during the summer months, with many residents of northern cities visiting for beach recreation. As such, local residents are heavily employed during summer months but are often underemployed during the winter. The main industries of the city include fishing, food processing, wine making, limestone quarrying, weaving, the manufacture of building materials, machinery, furniture manufacturing and tourism.

Yevpatoria has spas of mineral water, salt and mud lakes. These resorts belong to a vast area with curative facilities where the main health-improving factors are the sunshine and sea, air and sand, brine and mud of the salt lakes, as well as the mineral water of the hot springs. The population of the town is sure to have known about the curative qualities of the local mud that can be found here from time immemorial, which is witnessed by the manuscripts of Pliny the Elder, a Roman scholar (ca. 80 BC).

In Ukraine
On December 24, 2008, a blast destroyed a five-story building in the town. 27 people were killed. President of Ukraine Viktor Yushchenko declared December 26 to be a day of national mourning.

Two beaches in Yevpatoria have been Blue Flag beaches since May 2010, these were the first beaches (with two beaches in Yalta) to be awarded a Blue Flag in a CIS member state.

In 2014 due to the military operation of Russian Armed forces, the city of Yevpatoria was occupied by Russia with the entire Crimean peninsula. The UN General Assembly condemned Russian operation and considered the annexation the temporary occupation of part of the territory of Ukraine—the Autonomous Republic of Crimea and the City of Sevastopol.

Economy and Industry

 Industry, Engineering
 Agriculture
 AO Vympel NPO (MicroElectronics and Electronics, circuits microchips IC, Electrical parts, connectors, optoelectronics television and other devices and machinery, metallurgy engineering technology)
 Eupatoria Aircraft Plant and Repair EupAZ EARZ (An, Mi, Ka, Su, MiG, Yak, Il, Be, Tu; An-22, Su-25, MiG-31, Yak-38, Be-12, transport aircraft and amphibious)
 Construction, Building

Education 

 Institute of Social Sciences (Branch), Crimean Federal University

Demographics 
Ethnic composition of Yevpatoria in 2001 according to the Ukrainian census:

 Russians: 64,9%
 Ukrainians: 23,3%
 Crimean Tatars: 6,9%
 Belarusians: 1,5%
 Armenians: 0,5%
 Jews: 0,4%
 Tatars (excluding Crimean Tatars): 0,2%
 Poles: 0,2%
 Moldovans: 0,2%
 Azerbaijanis: 0,2%

Climate 
Yevpatoria has a humid subtropical climate (Cfa) under the Köppen climate classification with cool winters and warm to hot summers.

Area attractions
Famous attractions within or near Yevpatoria are:

 Juma-Jami Mosque
 Eupatorian Kenassas
 St. Nicholas' the Miracle Worker Cathedral
 Tekie Dervishes

Famous people from Yevpatoria
Lyudmila Alexeyeva  — Soviet and Russian human rights activist
Simeon Ezravic Douvan  — City Mayor and Duma Deputy 1905-1919
Maria Gorokhovskaya — Russian-born Soviet gymnast
Nikolaos Himonas (Nikolai Khimona) - painter of Greek descent
Zula Pogorzelska — Polish cabaret and film actress
Kseniya Simonova — Ukrainian sand animator and YouTube sensation
Sergei Sokolov — Russian-born Soviet Marshal
Ruslana Taran — Ukrainian sailor
Vitya Vronsky — pianist

Names of asteroid number 6489 and number 24648
Asteroid number 6489 has a name Golevka, which has a complicated origin. In 1995, Golevka was studied simultaneously by three radar observatories across the world: Goldstone in California, Eupatoria RT-70 radio telescope (Yevpatoriya is sometimes romanized as Evpatoria or Eupatoria (Russian origin)) and Kashima in Japan. 'Gol-Ev-Ka' comes from the first few letters of each observatory's name; it was proposed by the discoverer following a suggestion by Alexander L. Zaitsev.

Asteroid 24648 Evpatoria was discovered 1985 Sept. 19 by Nikolai Chernykh and Lyudmila Chernykh at the Crimean Astrophysical Observatory, and named in honor of Evpatoria (transliteration from Russian to English, thus Yevpatoriya). The minor planet marked the occasion of the 2500th anniversary of the town in 2003.

Twin towns – sister cities

Gallery

See also
 Battle of Eupatoria
 Yevpatoria assault
 The Evpatoria Report

References

External links

 http://evpatoriya-history.info/
 https://evp.rk.gov.ru/ru/index
 Yevpatoriya Photo gallery   - 
 The murder of the Jews of Yevpatoria during World War II, at Yad Vashem website.
 https://www.bloomberg.com/news/articles/2015-12-07/biden-says-illegal-russian-occupation-of-crimea-must-end
 http://www.kalamit.info/ 

 
Yevpatoria Municipality
Port cities of the Black Sea
Port cities and towns in Russia
Seaside resorts in Russia
Populated coastal places in Russia
Cities and towns in Russia
Cities in Crimea
Port cities and towns in Ukraine
Seaside resorts in Ukraine
Populated coastal places in Ukraine
Cities of regional significance in Ukraine
Yevpatoriysky Uyezd
Greek colonies on the Black Sea coast
Greek colonies in Crimea
Populated places established in the 1st millennium BC
Khazar towns
Bosporan Kingdom
Crimean Khanate
Holocaust locations in Ukraine
Territorial disputes of Ukraine